Noorpur Muzvita (also known as Noorpur Muzbida or Noorpur Harsana) is a village in the Khekra Tehsil, Bagpat district of Uttar Pradesh, India. Having a population of more than 3,000,

Geography 

Noorpur is located at 29.7°N 77.18°E. It has an average elevation of 230 metres (754 ft). The village is located on the banks of river Yamuna. It is 58 km from Meerut City and is on the main Delhi – Saharanpur Highway around 40 km from Delhi. In the north of the district Bagpat there is district Muzaffarnagar, in the south district Ghaziabad, in the west river Yamuna and district Rohtak of Haryana. The distance to New Delhi from this village is 40 km.

Education 

Educational institutions of Noorpur are:
 Gandhi Vidya Niketan Degree College, Ramala	
 Sardar Patal High School Uttar Pradesh/Baghpat/Bali Mewla, baghpat U.P. 250601
 Aryabhatt College Of Engg. & Technology	
 Dav English Medium School Uttar Pradesh/Baghpat/Baghpat 
 Janta Inter College

Economy/Agricultural 

Noorpur has agriculture as its main industry. The area is fertile, being close to the river Yamuna/Jamuna. Main crops are wheat, sugarcane and mustard. In fruits guavas are grown and Grapes too. Watermelons, muskmelons and 'kakri' make their appearance during summers.

References 

Villages in Bagpat district